Gyurmed Namgyal (Wylie: 'gyur med rnam rgyal) was the fourth Chogyal (king) of Sikkim. He succeeded Chakdor Namgyal in 1717 and was succeeded himself by Phuntsog Namgyal II in 1733.

During his reign Sikkim was attacked by Nepal.

References

External links
History of Sikkim

Monarchs of Sikkim
1707 births
1733 deaths